Fadil Nura (born 4 March 1979) is a politician in Kosovo. He was a member of the Assembly of the Republic of Kosovo from 2020 to 2021 and has been the mayor of Skenderaj  since 2021. Nura is a member of the Democratic Party of Kosovo (Partia Demokratike e Kosovës, PDK).

Early life and career
Nura was born in the village of Prelloc in the municipality of Skenderaj, in what was then the Socialist Autonomous Province of Kosovo in the Socialist Republic of Serbia, Socialist Federal Republic of Yugoslavia. He graduated from the University of Pristina's Faculty of Law in 2005 and earned a master's degree from the same institution in 2008, focusing on administrative-constitutional sciences. From 2008 to 2010, he was director of the administrative and staff department in Skenderaj.

Politician
Nura served as vice-mayor of Skenderaj from 2011 to 2014 and was the municipality's acting mayor from 2014 to 2017. He became deputy minister of justice in the Government of Kosovo in 2018 and served in this role for a time.

Assembly member
Nura was included on the PDK's electoral list for the 2019 Kosovan parliamentary election, which was conducted under open list proportional representation. He finished eighteenth among PDK candidates; the list won twenty-four seats, and he would have been elected had the mandates been assigned by vote totals alone. Because of a requirement for one-third female representation, however, he did not initially receive a seat.

He was awarded an assembly seat on 19 November 2020 as a replacement for party leader Kadri Veseli, who resigned from parliament after being indicted for war crimes and crimes against humanity during the Kosovo War. The rival Democratic League of Kosovo (Lidhja Demokratike e Kosovës, LDK) oversaw a coalition government during this time, and Nura served as a member of the opposition.

Nura was again included on the PDK's list for the 2021 Kosovan parliamentary election. He placed sixteenth among PDK candidates and was this time re-elected when the list won nineteen mandates. Vetëvendosje won the election, and Nura again served in opposition.

Mayor of Skenderaj
Nura later ran against incumbent Skenderaj mayor Bekim Jashari in the 2021 Kosovan local elections. During the campaign, Nura said that he had campaigned for Jashari in the previous local elections in 2017 and that the PDK had refrained from fielding a candidate against him on that occasion. He also said, however, that Skenderaj had stagnated under Jashari's leadership and that the municipality needed "protectionism, not dilettantism." He was successful, defeating Jashari in the first round of voting.

After winning the mayoral election, Nura resigned from the Kosovo assembly on 2 November 2021.

Electoral record

Local

Notes

References

1979 births
Living people
Kosovo Albanians
People from Skenderaj
Members of the Assembly of the Republic of Kosovo
Mayors of places in Kosovo
Democratic Party of Kosovo politicians